Daniel Ray Gonzales (born January 13, 1976) is an American football coach and former player. He is currently the head football coach at the University of New Mexico. Prior to 2018, Gonzales had spent his college coaching career on Rocky Long's staffs at the University of New Mexico and San Diego State University.

Playing career
Gonzales attended University of New Mexico, where he was a three-year letterman for the New Mexico Lobos at punter and safety. As a senior, he won the Chuck Cumming Memorial award for morale and spirit, and the Lobo Club Award for unselfish devotion to the team.

Coaching career
Following his playing career, Gonzales joined the coaching staff at the New Mexico as a graduate assistant from 1999 to 2002. He served as the team's video coordinator from 2003 to 2005. He was then promoted to a full-time assistant, coaching the team's safeties, kickers, punters and long snappers from 2006 to 2008.

In 2011, Gonzales joined Rocky Long's staff at San Diego State University. He coached the safeties for six seasons, before being promoted to defensive coordinator prior to the 2017 season. He continued to coach the safeties.

In 2018, Gonzales was hired as a part of Herm Edwards' first staff at Arizona State University to serve as the defensive coordinator.

On December 17, 2019, Gonzales was hired as the Lobo's new head coach, replacing Bob Davie.

Head coaching record

Personal life
Gonzales, an Albuquerque, New Mexico native, is a 1998 graduate of the University of New Mexico where he earned his bachelor's degree in business administration and general management, and his master's degree in physical education and recreation. He and his wife, Sandra, have four children: Cole, Jake, Chloe and Abby.

References

External links
 New Mexico profile
 Arizona State profile
 San Diego State profile

1976 births
Living people
American football punters
American football safeties
Arizona State Sun Devils football coaches
New Mexico Lobos football coaches
New Mexico Lobos football players
San Diego State Aztecs football coaches
Coaches of American football from New Mexico
Players of American football from Albuquerque, New Mexico